Four Directions is a Canadian dramatic anthology television series, which aired on CBC Television in 1996. The series consisted of four half-hour teleplays about First Nations characters and stories.

Background
First announced in 1992 as a 13-week series focusing on "the diversity of First Nations cultures", the planned series was reduced to eight, then to six and finally to four episodes by the time it actually went into production in 1994. In addition to writing one of the four episodes, Thomas King served as story editor for the series.

In addition to the episodes produced, rejected scripts were also submitted by Evan Adams and Drew Hayden Taylor.

Despite the episodes being completed in 1994, the series remained unscheduled for another two years until the network decided in 1996 to air it as a companion piece to the long-running drama series North of 60, which was at that time nearing the end of its run and airing a reduced number of episodes. Accordingly, two weeks in the fall of 1996 were chosen, during which two episodes of Four Directions would air in the North of 60 time slot.

During the delays in producing and scheduling the series, King publicly criticized the CBC for not undertaking sufficient effort to ensure that First Nations people were given the opportunity to get involved in and learn the production process.

Follow-up
The series was reaired on VisionTV in 1999.

Episodes

References

1996 Canadian television series debuts
1996 Canadian television series endings
1990s Canadian drama television series
1990s Canadian anthology television series
CBC Television original programming
First Nations television series